β-Farnesene synthase (EC 4.2.3.47, farnesene synthase, terpene synthase 10, terpene synthase 10-B73, TPS10) is an enzyme with systematic name (2E,6E)-farnesyl-diphosphate diphosphate-lyase ((E)-β-farnesene-forming). This enzyme catalyses the following chemical reaction

 (2E,6E)-farnesyl diphosphate  (E)-β-farnesene + diphosphate

References

External links 
 

EC 4.2.3